The 33rd Primetime Emmy Awards were held on Sunday, September 13, 1981. The ceremony was broadcast on CBS. It was hosted by Shirley MacLaine and Edward Asner.

For the third consecutive year, the Emmy for Outstanding Comedy Series went to Taxi. The top show on the drama side was Hill Street Blues which, in its first season, tied the record for most major nominations (14) and wins (6) by a non-miniseries. NBC's ratings juggernaut Shōgun received eight major nominations, but only won one, for Outstanding Limited Series.

Winners and nominees

Programs

Acting

Lead performances

Supporting performances

Directing

Writing

Most major nominations
By network 
 CBS – 52
 ABC – 40
 NBC – 32

 By program
 Hill Street Blues (NBC) – 14
 Lou Grant (CBS) – 10
 M*A*S*H (CBS) / Shōgun (NBC) / Taxi (ABC) – 8
 Masada (ABC) – 7
 Dallas (CBS) / Playing for Time (CBS) – 5

Most major awards
By network 
 CBS – 10
 NBC – 8
 ABC – 6

 By program
 Hill Street Blues (NBC) – 6
 Taxi (ABC) – 5
 Playing for Time (CBS) – 4

Notes

References

External links
 Emmys.com list of 1981 Nominees & Winners
 

033
Primetime Emmy Awards
Primetime Emmy Awards
Primetime Emmy Awards